Byron M. Jones is a Christian film producer and managing partner of Pure Flix Entertainment.

Cloud Ten

Jones started his career as Cloud Ten's VP of Entertainment, bringing movies such as Left Behind to the forefront of the industry. Left Behind was the #1 selling video in America its first week of release, beating out Toy Story 2 and The Green Mile.

Byron began his career in marketing at Cloud Ten Pictures in 1997, where he headed up the sales and marketing departments during the release of the best-selling Christian films such as Apocalypse, Revelation, Tribulation and Judgment, helping to develop international recognition and demand for quality Christian Movies.  Byron maintained this position until January 2002.

While with Cloud Ten, Billboard Magazine quoted Byron as saying "There are 170 Million Americans who go to church every Sunday, most of these people want to see an edgy action movie without all the other stuff."

Garden City Pictures
Canadian Christianity ran a story on Jones talking about the new studio that he would start in Niagara Falls, Canada, "Our plan is not to bring Christianity to Hollywood, but to bring Hollywood-quality productions to the church," explains Byron Jones, president of Garden City Pictures.  It was with Garden City that Byron would bring aboard an Oscar award-winning, special effects supervisor and director to work on their first feature Home Beyond the Sun, a Christian film that examines contemporary China's dilemma of unwanted daughters in an overpopulated land of more than a billion souls. It is inspired by the true story of one of the children, the "found forsaken", finding familial love.

Willowcreek Marketing And Distribution

With the connections that Byron had made in and throughout the industry and also founded Willowcreek Marketing and Distribution; a Christian marketing company which also is the official booking agency for the "Million Dollar Man" Ted DiBiase (Formerly of World Wrestling Entertainment).

Willowcreek is also responsible for the marketing and distribution of such film titles as a multi-award winning documentary film be the Erwin Brothers about the events of 9/11/2001.

Pure Flix Entertainment

Beginning in January 2007, Byron Jones became a Managing Partner with Pure Flix Entertainment. Byron along with musician Randy Travis, actor David A. R. White, Michael Scott, and Russell Wolfe. Pure Flix is known for producing and distributing movies such as The Wager, Hidden Secrets, and Sarah's Choice.

CMD Distribution

CMD Distribution was a faith and family film distribution company, headquartered in Wake Forest, North Carolina. The company distributed, acquired Christian and family-friendly films.  The company was forced to close after the Family Christian Stores filed for Chapter 11 Bankruptcy and the closer of Allegro

Filmography
Producer – Holyman Undercover (2010)
Producer – Sarah's Choice (2009)
Producer – In the Blink of an Eye (2009)
Producer – The Wager (2007)
Producer – Home Beyond the Sun (2004)
Actor – In the Blink of an Eye

Personal life

He also has two daughters. Byron is also currently married. Byron is a practicing Christian.

References

External links
 willowcreekmarketing.com (Official Willowcreek Marketing Website)
 pureflixentertainment.com (Official Pure Flix Entertainment Website)

Living people
Film producers from Ontario
People from North Bay, Ontario
Year of birth missing (living people)